The fourth season of the stop-motion television series Robot Chicken originally aired in the United States on Cartoon Network's late night programming block, Adult Swim. Season four officially began on December 7, 2008, on Adult Swim, with "Help Me", and ended with "Dear Consumer" on December 6, 2009, with a total of twenty episodes.

The fourth season was released on the Season Four: Uncensored DVD on December 15, 2009 in Region 1, August 30, 2010 in Region 2 and December 2, 2009 in Region 4.

Overview 
The fourth season of Robot Chicken includes many TV, movie, TV commercial, and pop culture parodies, and non-sequitur blackouts, all acted out by dolls and action figures, including parody's like, Tila Tequila reveals a deadly secret, which ends up being that she's a robot, A contractor builds temples for the Indiana Jones movies, Dick Cheney becomes Tony Stark's unexpected ally, the creators imagine a deleted scene from Daredevil, Joey Fatone pitches his idea for a sketch, Strawberry Shortcake solves a robbery, O. J. searches for his ex-wife's killer, Star Trek II: The Wrath of Khan is shown as an opera, the creators imagine what happens when Punky Brewster hits puberty, Criss Angel delivers the Ultimate Mind Freak at Hogwarts, the Creature from the Black Lagoon creates the newest monster-based cereal, Kermit the Frog introduces everyone to his cousin, Annie Warbucks has her Sweet 16, transients begin to wear Clark Kent's clothing, Gyro-Robo add some depth to D&D, Transformers mourn a fallen hero, Batman gets a new look at Two-Face, John Connor gets his first Terminator, the new Bachelor is a beast, and a new spin on Alfred Hitchcock's Rear Window.

Guest stars 
Many celebrities have guest starred in Robot Chicken season four. They include Sarah Michelle Gellar, Mila Kunis, Seth MacFarlane, Katee Sackhoff, Tila Tequila, Joss Whedon, Ronald D. Moore, Sebastian Bach, Alex Borstein, Milo Ventimiglia, Eden Espinosa, Rachael Leigh Cook, Stuart Townsend, Kevin Shinick, Christian Slater, Zac Efron, Donald Faison, Joey Fatone, Rashida Jones, Ron Perlman, Billy Dee Williams, Emmanuelle Chriqui, Amy Smart, Skeet Ulrich, David Faustino, Jim Cummings, Lee Majors, Jon Favreau, Scott Porter, Mark Hamill, Hulk Hogan, Jamie Kaler, Soleil Moon Frye, Nathan Fillion, Jean-Claude Van Damme, Adrianne Palicki, David Hasselhoff, Neil Patrick Harris, Monica Keena, Abraham Benrubi, Simon Pegg, T-Pain, Chace Crawford, Sandra Oh, Spencer Grammer, Joel McHale, Clark Duke, Vanessa Hudgens, James Marsden and Greg Grunberg.

Episodes

DVD release

References 

2008 American television seasons
2009 American television seasons
Robot Chicken seasons